Jean Claes (10 July 1902 – 1 March 1979) was a Belgian footballer. He played in one match for the Belgium national football team in 1925.

References

External links
 

1902 births
1979 deaths
Belgian footballers
Belgium international footballers
Place of birth missing
Association football defenders
K. Berchem Sport players